Inger Ester Malena Engström (born 3 April 1967 in Västerås) is a Swedish actress.

Selected filmography
2000 – Rederiet (TV)
2000 – Brottsvåg (TV)
2002 – Klassfesten
2003 – Spung (TV)
2004 – Falla vackert
2004 – Att sörja Linnea (TV)
2005 – Wallander – Innan frosten

References

External links

Swedish television actresses
People from Västerås
1967 births
Living people